The Empire of Austenasia is a micronation founded in 2008 in the United Kingdom. Operating under the constitutional monarchy of its fourth Emperor, Jonathan I, it consists of dozens of properties that have declared themselves independent under the leadership of a house in the London Borough of Sutton.

Drawing from the medieval idea of Translatio imperii, Austenasia claims to be a successor of the Roman Empire (specifically its later Christian phase) and has increasingly adopted Roman-themed elements such as Consuls and a Senate. Christianity was declared Austenasia's official religion in 2017.

History 

Austenasia was founded on 20 September 2008 by Jonathan Austen (born 1994), a student, and his father Terry Austen (born 1961), a security guard turned gardener. After sending a declaration of independence for their house in Carshalton to their local Member of Parliament, Tom Brake, Terry was named Emperor and Jonathan was named Prime Minister. Terry abdicated in February 2010, and was succeeded by Emperor Esmond III, who after a "civil war" and various internal disputes was replaced by a new leader, Declan MacDonagh, in December later that year. Jonathan then became emperor after Declan abdicated in January 2013 for personal reasons, and began a program of expansion which has seen people from across the world join the micronation by claiming properties which they live in or regularly visit. The micronation has been featured in several local and international publications, and has a certain amount of fame within Carshalton as being a local "quirk".
The micronation produced and sold commemorative coins in 2018 in celebration of its tenth anniversary.

Having initially received no reply to their declaration of independence, Jonathan met with Tom Brake MP in May 2011, who contacted Foreign Secretary William Hague to enquire on Jonathan's behalf about the criteria by which the UK recognises new states.

Geography 
Austenasia claims several properties around the world, variously classified as "cities", "towns", "territories" or "crown dependencies". Wrythe, the micronation's "capital city", consists of a suburban house in the London Borough of Sutton. Several other British houses are also claimed, and other territorial claims include part of a university campus in Australia and a holiday home in the Hebrides. The micronation also has claims in the United States, Turkey, India, Algeria, Poland and other nations.

See also 
 List of micronations

References

Further reading

External links 
 
 

Micronations in England
Separatism in the United Kingdom